Menschen im Hotel is a 1959 German and French black-and-white drama film directed by Gottfried Reinhardt, and produced by Artur Brauner. It starred O.W. Fischer, Michèle Morgan, Heinz Rühmann and Gert Fröbe. The screenplay was written by Ladislas Fodor and Hans Jacoby, based on the 1929 novel by Vicki Baum. The film is a remake of the 1932 classic Grand Hotel.

Plot
The film shows two days and nights in a Berlin luxury hotel and tells the story of how the paths of various quite different characters cross. It begins with an attempted suicide by the famous dancer Grusinskaja. She is rescued by an impoverished noble, Baron von Gaigern, and falls in love with him. Von Gaigern, who makes a living as a hotel thief, learns about the corrupt dealings by businessman Preysing. He attempts to blackmail Preysing, with tragic results.

Cast
O.W. Fischer as  Baron von Gaigern
Michèle Morgan as  Grusinskaja
Heinz Rühmann as  Kringelein
Sonja Ziemann as  Flämmchen
Gert Fröbe as  Preysing
Dorothea Wieck as  Suzanne
Wolfgang Wahl as  Max, the chauffeur
Friedrich Schoenfelder as  Receptionist
Jean-Jacques Delbo as  1st doorman
 as  2nd doorman
Siegfried Schürenberg as  Dr. Behrend

Production
Menschen im Hotel was a German-French co-production, directed by Gottfried Reinhardt and produced by Artur Brauner. The screenplay was written by Ladislas Fodor and Hans Jacoby, based on the 1929 novel by Vicki Baum. The film is a remake of the 1932 classic Grand Hotel, starring Greta Garbo and John Barrymore.

Filming took place from 15 February to 31 March 1959 at the Spandau Studios in Berlin.

Censorship
When Menschen im Hotel was first released in Italy in 1959 the Committee for the Theatrical Review of the Italian Ministry of Cultural Heritage and Activities rated the film VM18: not suitable for children under 18. In order for the film to be screened publicly, the Committee recommended the removal of the entire scene in which Fiammetta undresses in the bathroom until the moment when she shows up wearing a bathrobe. The official document number is: N° 27922, it was signed on 10 October 1958 by Minister Domenico Magrì.

Release
Menschen im Hotel at the time received a FSK rating of "18 and older". The film premiered on 23 September 1959 at Gloria Palast in Munich. The premiere of the French (dubbed) version was in Paris, on 25 March 1960.

References

External links

Grand Hôtel at CinEmotions 

 Artur-Brauner-Archive at the Deutsches Filmmuseum in Frankfurt (German), containing the production files for this movie

1959 films
1959 drama films
German drama films
French drama films
West German films
1950s German-language films
Films directed by Gottfried Reinhardt
Films set in Berlin
Films set in hotels
Films based on Austrian novels
Remakes of American films
French remakes of American films
Films shot at Spandau Studios
1950s German films
1950s French films